The Clarksburg School is a historic building located at Clarksburg, Montgomery County, Maryland, United States. It is a rectangular frame structure with a prominent projecting porch on the main facade. It is the last remaining of four similar frame public school structures built shortly after the turn of the 20th century in Montgomery County and was in continuous service from 1909 to 1972.

The Clarksburg School was listed on the National Register of Historic Places in 1975.

References

External links
, including undated photo, at Maryland Historical Trust website

School buildings on the National Register of Historic Places in Maryland
Buildings and structures in Montgomery County, Maryland
National Register of Historic Places in Montgomery County, Maryland